The Virginia Tech–West Virginia football rivalry is an American college football rivalry between the Virginia Tech Hokies and West Virginia Mountaineers. The teams met 53 times between 1912 and 2021, every year from 1973 to 2005, and as conference foes from 1991 to 2003 as members of the Big East Conference. The winner of the game receives the Black Diamond Trophy sponsored by Rish Equipment Company, headquartered in Bluefield, West Virginia. It was introduced in 1997 and was meant to symbolize the Appalachian region's rich coal heritage (the phrase "black diamond" is often used as a term for coal.)

West Virginia holds the trophy and leads the all-time series 30–23–1. The last game currently scheduled was played on September 22, 2022 at Lane Stadium in Blacksburg, VA; the Mountaineers won what may be the final trophy game in a blowout, 33–10. West Virginia also holds the longest win streak in the series, winning seven consecutive irregularly scheduled games against the Hokies between 1915 and 1958.

It is Pitt

History

Early games
The first game between West Virginia and Virginia Polytechnic took place in 1912, but the teams started playing consistently in 1973. When head coach Frank Beamer began leading the Hokies to success in the 1990s, the rivalry soon elevated.

The first big game of the rivalry came in 1974. Both teams were wrapping up losing seasons in Blacksburg, but neither thought the game would be so hard-fought. Former West Virginia head coach Bobby Bowden even received an unsportsmanlike conduct penalty against him for arguing a personal foul that cost the Mountaineers 30 yards. The game featured a 99-yard interception return and an 85-yard touchdown run for Artie Owens and the Mountaineers. The Hokies had two chances to hit a game-winning field goal, after a penalty on West Virginia, but missed both and lost 22–21. Only a year later, West Virginia picked up a hard-fought 10–7 win which ended with a Mountaineer game-winning field goal.

In 1979, West Virginia capped one of the greatest comebacks in the rivalry's history. Down 23–6 at halftime, the Mountaineers rallied behind quarterback Oliver Luck and his four second-half touchdowns to pull out a 34–23 come-from-behind victory.

1980s
After West Virginia pulled off the comeback in 1979, the Hokies up-ended new head coach Don Nehlen at West Virginia. The Hokies, who eventually made it to the Peach Bowl, thrashed the legendary coach's team 34–11. Virginia Tech runningback Cyrus Lawrence ran for 173 yards, the most ever by a Virginia Tech back in the series. A defensive struggle in 1984 also highlighted the early 80s contests. The game was won by the Mountaineers 14–7, despite being outgained 339–240 by Virginia Tech.

In 1988, en route to the first undefeated regular season in school history, West Virginia won against the Hokies 22–10. In the hardest game for the Mountaineers in that season, West Virginia battled six turnovers and 13 penalties to win. Former head coach Don Nehlen said about playing in Blacksburg, "Playing here is like airplane landings – any one you can walk away from is a good one." The following year, 1989, West Virginia lost a dramatic game to the Hokies, 12–10. The win was the first for Virginia Tech in Morgantown since 1967 (when coach Frank Beamer played for the Hokies) and the first time that the Hokies defeated a ranked Mountaineer team who was coming off of the undefeated '88 season.

1990s
In 1991, Virginia Tech overcame the odds to beat West Virginia 20–14. Heavy rain, a 50-minute lightning delay, and a late offensive surge by the Mountaineers threatened Virginia Tech's win. But when the Mountaineers fumbled on a one-yard line handoff with 16 seconds left, the Hokies came away with the win.

West Virginia handed the Hokies payback for the '91 contest in 1993, when they again ended the season undefeated. The Mountaineers pulled out a 14–13 win, despite five turnovers and a late Virginia Tech field goal attempt (which sailed wide right). Head coach Frank Beamer, on the hot seat, saved his job by leading the Hokies to the Independence Bowl. The 1994 game was the first to be televised by ESPN. The game was a 34–6 win for the No. 14-ranked Hokies and began a winning span of three years by a combined score of 92–20.

In 1997, West Virginia ended Virginia Tech's three-year winning streak in front of 64,000 fans and a CBS television audience (the first of the series). The Mountaineers won 30–17 behind Amos Zereoué's 153 rushing yards and Marc Bulger's passing and rushing touchdowns.

One of the greatest wins in the series by the Hokies came in 1999. With Marc Bulger out for the Mountaineers, and freshman sensation Michael Vick at quarterback for the No. 3 Hokies, Virginia Tech won 22–20 in dramatic fashion. West Virginia scored the go-ahead touchdown to put them up 20–19 with 1:15 left. However, Vick led the Hokies on a dramatic drive, highlighted by a key 26-yard scramble down the sideline when it appeared he'd run out-of-bounds. Shayne Graham then hit a 44-yard field goal as time expired to preserve Virginia Tech's undefeated season and keep their national title hopes alive. They also moved up a spot, as Minnesota upset then-No. 2 Penn State 24–23 on a 32-yard field goal by Dan Nystrom as time expired in Happy Valley to become bowl-eligible earlier in the day.

2000s
The following season after Michael Vick's dramatic comeback for the Hokies, Virginia Tech again came back to beat West Virginia. After leading 14–7 in the third quarter, the Mountaineers collapsed. André Davis, Tech's speedy receiver, scored on a 30-yard reverse, a 64-yard pass and a 76-yard punt return in the span of six minutes to lead the Hokies to a 48–20 victory. 41 of Tech's 48 points came in the second half, which was a school record.

In 2003, the No. 3 Hokies came into Morgantown and were upset 28–7. The Hokies had beaten Syracuse 51–7 previously, while West Virginia was 2–4. The game featured a 93-yard pass by Rasheed Marshall to give the Mountaineers a 21–7 lead. Marshall also scored the last touchdown on a four-yard run. West Virginia head coach Rich Rodriguez said "that may have been the most electric crowd that I’ve seen since I’ve been back here. My wife said everybody stood up and yelled from the start until the finish of that game."

In 2004, the Hokies got revenge for their upset the season before. The No. 6-ranked Mountaineers lost 19–13 in Blacksburg to a key field goal block that was taken back 74 yards to give the Hokies a 13–0 lead.

In 2005, Virginia Tech, led by Marcus Vick, dominated West Virginia 34–17 and became the only team to top them in the 2005 season.

However, in 2004, Virginia Tech officially left the former Big East Conference and joined the Atlantic Coast Conference. This caused a major break in the rivalry's yearly schedule and forced both schools to plan future matchups between the will of their athletic departments.

2010s
Leading up to their 2012 game against James Madison at FedExField, then West Virginia athletic director Oliver Luck indicated a similar neutral site meeting could be possible between West Virginia and Virginia Tech. "In my discussions with (athletic director) Jim Weaver, our only opportunity to play a Virginia Tech might be this kind of game (referring to their game against James Madison) because they are not really interested in a home-and-home", Luck said. "It's less of a commitment."

In May 2013, Luck stated with the implementation of a College Football Playoff replacing the Bowl Championship Series in regards scheduling out-of conference opponents:

"I would love to get Pitt back on the schedule, I would love to get (Virginia) Tech back on the schedule, I would to get UVA back on the schedule, another school that we used to play a lot, and even Penn State," Luck said. "Is that possible? Well, it takes two to tango, but I think the good news is we will see some stronger non-conference schedules as we go forward."

On July 3, 2013 the two schools announced that the series would resume with a home-and-home series beginning on September 18, 2021 in Morgantown and concluding the next year on September 24, 2022 in Blacksburg. Also, on July 15, 2014, the two schools announced a neutral site game at FedExField in Landover, Maryland will be played on September 3, 2017. The future of the Black Diamond Trophy was uncertain following both schools' move from the Big East. Virginia Tech has confirmed that the Black Diamond Trophy will be up for grabs in the 2017, 2021, and 2022 games.

On September 3, 2017, the two schools once again faced each other in a neutral location after nearly a 12-year hiatus. The highly competitive matchup at FedExField in Landover, Maryland resulted in a No. 21 Virginia Tech victory over No. 22 West Virginia with a score of 31–24.

Game results

See also  
 List of NCAA college football rivalry games

References

College football rivalries in the United States
Virginia Tech Hokies football
West Virginia Mountaineers football